Patti Schmidt is a Canadian radio personality from CBC Radio and a former singer and bassist . She currently lives in Montreal.

Origin
Schmidt grew up in Ottawa and attended McGill University as an undergraduate. While at McGill she became involved with CKUT-FM. As a fan of Brave New Waves, in 1991 CBC Radio hired her on a series of temporary contracts.  She then became the primary host of Brave New Waves from 1995 to 2006, replacing Brent Bambury. Schmidt was also the executive producer.

Schmidt has also hosted the weekly CBC Radio One show Cinq à Six from Montreal, a program "that explores new directions in culture in Quebec - directions in music, literature, theatre, architecture and design and in the business of art"; Canada Live, a program on CBC Radio 2 devoted to concert performances; and Inside the Music, a program which airs documentaries about music.

In September 2008, Schmidt began a graduate degree in communications and art history at McGill University, while she also began programming and curating for the MUTEK festival of electronic music and digital arts.

Music career
During the mid-to-late 1990s Schmidt was a singer and bassist with Pest 5000, a band that also featured Brave New Waves producer Kevin Komoda (Rational Youth), Genevieve Heistek, Jon Acensio (Doughboys/Starbean), and a long line of drummers including Howard Bilerman (Hotel2Tango studios/Arcade Fire) Colin Burnett (GYBE/Bliss), Andy Vial (Barr Brothers), Alexander McSween (The Nils/Bionic/Detention). They released recordings on Harriet Records, No Life and derivative, run by Schmidt, Komoda and Patrick Hamou. Their international roster included Sportsguitar, The Grifters, Shadowy Men on a Shadowy Planet, Eric's Trip, Jale, Number One Cup and the Ladybug Transistor among many others. She founded a subsequent group with Komoda and Lewis Braden, called The Nanobot Auxiliary Ballet. Alongside Jeff Waye (manager/owner of the North American component of Ninja Tune Records), the pair started the Ta-Da record label, releasing full lengths for NAB, and The World Provider and EPs by The Republic of Safety, Laura Barrett, and Hank.

References

External links
 Interview at Discorder 
 Review of Nanobot Auxiliary Ballet's 1st album at PopMatters
 Interview with Nanobot Auxiliary Ballet
 
 Interview with Pest 5000
 Cinq à six site at CBC

Canadian bass guitarists
Canadian women singers
Canadian people of German descent
CBC Radio hosts
Anglophone Quebec people
McGill University alumni
Singers from Montreal 
Musicians from Ottawa 
Living people
Year of birth missing (living people)
Place of birth missing (living people)
Women bass guitarists
Canadian women radio hosts